Amr El-Safty (Arabic: عمرو الصفتي; born 17 February 1982 at Portsaid) is an Egyptian retired footballer.

Career
El-Safty joined Zamalek from El-Masry in July 2006.

In August 2011, El-Safty joined El Gouna from Zamalek, in 2013 he joined Ghazl El-Mahalla for one season.

He is a very strong defender, he is known as an excellent header, who has the ability to score from corners and free kicks and scores many goals with El-Masry and Zamalek.

Honors

With Zamalek
Egyptian Cup (2008)

References

1982 births
Living people
Egyptian footballers
Zamalek SC players
Al Masry SC players
Sportspeople from Port Said
Egyptian Premier League players
Association football defenders